Marick may refer to:

Fictional characters
Alex Devane Marick, fictional character on the soap opera All My Children (1999–2001)
Dimitri Marick, fictional character from the ABC daytime drama All My Children
Dimitri Marick and Erica Kane, fictional characters and a supercouple from All My Children
Marik Ishtar, fictional character from the Yu-Gi-Oh! franchise

Other
Marick Press, non-profit publishing house founded in Grosse Pointe Park, Michigan, in 2005